Aleksis Kivi (born Alexis Stenvall; 10 October 1834 – 31 December 1872) was a Finnish author who wrote the first significant novel in the Finnish language, Seitsemän veljestä ("Seven Brothers") in 1870. He is also known for his 1864  play Heath Cobblers. Although Kivi was among the very earliest authors of prose and lyrics in Finnish, he is still considered one of the greatest.

Kivi is regarded as a national writer of Finland and his birthday, 10 October, is celebrated as Finnish Literature Day.

Life
Aleksis Stenvall was born in Palojoki village of Nurmijärvi, Grand Duchy of Finland. His parents were the village tailor Erik Johan Stenvall (1798–1866) and Anna-Kristiina Hamberg (1793–1863). Before Aleksis, the family already had three sons, Johannes, Emanuel, and Albert. Aleksis also had a sister, Agnes, who died in 1851 at the age of only 13.

In 1846 he left for school in Helsinki, and in 1859 he was accepted into the University of Helsinki, where he studied literature and developed an interest in the theatre. His first play was Kullervo, based on a tragic tale from the Kalevala. He also met the famous journalist and statesman Johan Vilhelm Snellman who became his supporter.

During his time at school Kivi read world literature from the library of his landlord, and during his University studies, he saw plays by Molière and Schiller at the Swedish Theatre in Helsinki. Kivi also had friends such as Fredrik Cygnaeus and Elias Lönnrot.

From 1863 onwards, Kivi devoted his time to writing. He wrote 12 plays and a collection of poetry. The novel  Seitsemän veljestä ("Seven Brothers") took him ten years to write. Literary critics, especially the prominent August Ahlqvist, disapproved of the book, at least nominally because of its "rudeness" – Romanticism was at its height at the time; Ahlqvist also wrote "It is a ridiculous work and a blot on the name of Finnish literature". It is known that no other critic hated Kivi's writings as much as Ahlqvist, in which case the situation could almost be called "persecution", but the Fennomans also disapproved of its depiction of not-so-virtuous rural life that was far from their idealized point of view, and Kivi's excessive drinking may have alienated some.

In 1865 Kivi won the State Prize for his still often performed comedy Nummisuutarit ('The Cobblers on the Heath', translated as Heath Cobblers by Douglas Robinson). However, the less than enthusiastic reception of his books was taking its toll and he was already drinking heavily. His main benefactor Charlotta Lönnqvist, with whom Kivi lived in Siuntio at the time of his creative writing, could not help him after the 1860s.

Kivi's health had failed completely in 1870, when he lived at Franzén croft in Tapanila, Helsinki. The collapse was accelerated by typhoid and attacks of delirium and in 1871 he was admitted to the New Clinic, from where he was transferred to the psychiatric hospital at Lapinlahti, Helsinki. The doctor treating him, A. T. Saelan, diagnosed him with melancholia resulting from "injured dignity as a writer". On the basis of the available documents, Kalle Achté concludes that it was a classic case of schizophrenia, triggered by severe states of anxiety. It has also been suggested, however, that Kivi's mental illness may have been caused by advanced borreliosis. Kivi died in poverty at the age of 38 in Tuusula, at the home of his brother Albert near the Lake Tuusula. According to legend, his last words were, "I live".

Legacy
In the early 20th century young writers Volter Kilpi and Eino Leino raised Kivi to the status of  national icon. Eino Leino – and later Väinö Linna and Veijo Meri – also identified with Kivi's fate as an author.

In 1936 the Aleksis Kivi Prize, awarded for contributions to Finnish literature, was established.

In 1939 the Aleksis Kivi Memorial, a bronze statue of Kivi by Wäinö Aaltonen, was erected in front of the Finnish National Theatre. Many streets in Finnish cities and towns have also been named after Kivi, such as Aleksis Kiven katu in Tampere.

In 1995 to 1996, Finnish composer Einojuhani Rautavaara wrote an opera about Kivi's life and works.

Gallery

Kivi in English
 Impola, Richard A., trans. Aleksis Kivi, Seven Brothers (English translation of Seitsemän veljestä). New Paltz, NY: Finnish-American Translators Association, 1991.
 Matson, Alex, trans. Aleksis Kivi, Seven Brothers (English translation of Seitsemän veljestä). 1st edition, New York: Coward-McCann, 1929. 2nd edition, Helsinki: Tammi, 1952. 3rd edition, edited by Irma Rantavaara, Helsinki: Tammi, 1973.
 Robinson, Douglas, trans. Aleksis Kivi's Heath Cobblers and Kullervo. St. Cloud, MN: North Star Press of St. Cloud, 1993.
 Robinson, Douglas, trans. The Brothers Seven. Bucharest, Romania: Zeta Books, 2017

References

Secondary sources 
 Robinson, Douglas, Aleksis Kivi and/as World Literature. Leiden and Boston: Brill, 2017.
 Tarkiainen, Viljo, Aleksis Kivi: elämä ja teokset. WSOY, 1950.

External links 

 Aleksis Kivi page maintained by Nurmijärvi municipality
 
 
 
 Text of Seven Brothers in Finnish 
 Nummisuutarit – digital critical edition (in Finnish). Eds. Jyrki Nummi (editor-in-chief), Sakari Katajamäki, Ossi Kokko and Petri Lauerma. Finnish Literature Society, 2011.
The Aleksis Kivi Brothers Seven Translation Assessment Project, publicly accessible, provided by Hong Kong Baptist University Library

1834 births
1872 deaths

People from Nurmijärvi
People from Uusimaa Province (Grand Duchy of Finland)
Finnish male novelists
Finnish dramatists and playwrights
Finnish-language writers
Writers from Uusimaa
Fennomans
19th-century Finnish writers
National symbols of Finland
19th-century Finnish novelists
19th-century Finnish dramatists and playwrights